Ryan Dicker (born 22 September 1986) is an English professional footballer who plays as a central defender for Leek Town and the British Virgin Islands national football team.

Club career

Newcastle Town 
Dicker joined Newcastle Town on 31 July 2008. He made his debut on 10 August 2008. Whilst at Newcastle Town he accumulated one yellow card, two red cards, and scored four goals in 51 appearances.

Having previously played for Alsager Town, Newcastle Town, Nantwich Town and Stafford Rangers, he joined Leek Town in 2013.

International career 
He was called up to the British Virgin Islands national team and made his debut on 22 March 2015 in a friendly match against Antigua and Barbuda.

Coaching career 
Dicker also serves as an academy coach for Crewe Alexandra.

Career statistics

International

References

External links

1986 births
Living people
British Virgin Islands international footballers
English footballers
Alsager Town F.C. players
Newcastle Town F.C. players
Stafford Rangers F.C. players
Kidsgrove Athletic F.C. players
Leek Town F.C. players
Association football central defenders
British Virgin Islands footballers